Alice Peacock (born November 19, 1969) is an American folk singer and has recorded five independent albums and an album released by Aware/Columbia Records (2002).  A native of White Bear Lake, Minnesota, she lived in Chicago, Illinois where she sang "The Star-Spangled Banner" at U.S. Cellular Field during the 2005 playoff run of the Chicago White Sox and on April 4, 2006, at their World Series ring ceremony.   She now calls Cincinnati, Ohio home.

Several of Peacock's songs have been featured in films, commercials, and television.  "Leading With My Heart" was featured on the soundtrack for the film Win a Date with Tad Hamilton!.  Her song "Sunflower" was featured in the film Because of Winn-Dixie and was released on her album Who I Am. "Bliss" was featured in clothing ads for J. Jill, and in Hershey's commercials, and is included on her self-titled album. The Beginning was featured in the 2006 series finale of What I Like About You.

She has been on the Board of Governors for the Chicago Chapter of The Recording Academy (GRAMMYS), Chapter President and a National Trustee.  She currently serves on the Nashville Board of the Recording Academy.  She attended Lawrence University, graduating in 1992.  The university honored her with its Lucia Russell Briggs Distinguished Achievement Award.

Discography
Real Day, 1999
Alice Peacock, 2002, featuring backup vocals by John Mayer and Indigo Girl Emily Saliers
Who I Am, 2006
Love Remains, 24 March 2009
"Myrick/Peacock", 2011
Live From Space, 2014
Minnesota, 2019

References

External links
Alice Peacock official site
ROCKWIRED INTERVIEWS ALICE PEACOCK (2006)

1971 births
Living people
American folk singers
Singers from Chicago
21st-century American singers
Singer-songwriters from Illinois